Salvinorin B methoxymethyl ether (2-O-methoxymethylsalvinorin B) is a semi-synthetic analogue of the natural product salvinorin A used in scientific research. It has a longer duration of action of around 2–3 hours, compared to less than 30 minutes for salvinorin A, and has increased affinity and potency at the κ-opioid receptor. It is made from salvinorin B, which is most conveniently made from salvinorin A by deacetylation. The crystal structure reveals that the methoxy group overlaps with the acetyl group of salvinorin A, but with a different orientation.

Salvinorin B methoxymethyl ether has a Ki of 0.60 nM at the κ opioid receptor, and is around five times more potent than salvinorin A in animal studies, although it is still only half as potent as its stronger homolog salvinorin B ethoxymethyl ether (symmetry).

See also 
 Salvinorin B ethoxymethyl ether
 RB-64

References 

Synthetic opioids
Dissociative drugs
3-Furyl compounds
Lactones
Ethers
Ketones
Kappa-opioid receptor agonists
Methyl esters